Suutarila is a subdistrict located next to Keravanjoki in a northeastern major district of Helsinki, Finland, near the border to Vantaa

It has an area of 4.13 km2 and a population of 11,413. The neighbouring areas in Helsinki are Tapaninvainio and Tapulikaupunki. Neighbouring areas in Vantaa are Tikkurila, Tammisto and Veromies.

References 

 
Neighbourhoods of Helsinki